The 2015–16 Segunda División de Futsal season was the 23rd season of second-tier futsal in Spain since its inception in 1993.

The season comprises regular season and promotion playoff. Regular season began on September 19, 2015 and finished on April 17, 2016. After completing 26 matches, top team is promoted to Primera División, teams qualified in 2–5 place play promotion playoff while the bottom team is relegated Segunda División B.

Promotion playoff kick-off on April 23/24, playing semifinals and Final to the best of 3 matches. Winner of promotion playoff will be promoted to Primera División 2016–17.

Teams

Regular season standings

FS Zamora was disqualified on 30 December 2015 for steadily breaching competition rules. 
deducted points:
Prone Lugo; 2 points
Melilla; 3 points
Zamora; 5 points

Promotion playoffs

Calendar

Bracket

Semifinals

1st leg

2nd leg

 Gran Canaria won series 2–0 and advanced to Final.

3rd leg

 Naturpellet Segovia won series 2–1 and advanced to Final.

Final

1st leg

2nd leg

Top scorers

See also
2015–16 Primera División de Futsal
2015–16 Copa del Rey de Futsal
Segunda División B de Futsal

References

External links
2015–16 results at lnfs.es
2015–16 standings at lnfs.es
2015–16 promotion playoff at lnfs.es

2015–16 in Spanish futsal
Futsal2
Segunda División de Futsal seasons